Ziemianin is a Polish surname. Notable people with the surname include:

 Jan Ziemianin (born 1962), Polish biathlete
 Wiesław Ziemianin (born 1970), Polish biathlete

See also
 

Polish-language surnames